The Meeting of Frederick II and Joseph II in Neisse in 1769 is an oil on canvas history painting by Adolph Menzel, executed in 1855–1857, showing the meeting of Frederick II of Prussia with Joseph II, Holy Roman Emperor at Neisse on 25 August 1769. It is now in the Alte Nationalgalerie in Berlin.

Theme
In the War of Austrian Succession from 1740 to 1748 and in the Seven Years' War from 1756 to 1763, Prussia under Frederick II and Austria under Maria Theresa were bitter opponents. The long-standing struggles ended for the Habsburg monarchy with the loss of Silesia.

Maria Theresa's son Archduke Joseph, Emperor of the Holy Roman Empire since 1765, admired the enlightened monarch Frederick for his military, administrative and economic successes and from 1766 tried to meet him. After initial resistance from Maria Theresa, the encounter took place in 1769 in the residential town of Neisse, near the border, where Frederick was staying for military maneuvers. Joseph, as Count von Falkenstein, arrived in Neisse around noon on August 25 and went straight to the prince-bishop's palace, where Frederick received him. The encounter was attended by senior nobles and military officials from both sides. The Kaiser and the King stayed in Neisse until August 28th. During the day they watched the Prussian maneuvers, in the evening they visited the Opéra comique.

References

1857 paintings
History paintings
Paintings in the collection of the Alte Nationalgalerie
Paintings by Adolph Menzel
Cultural depictions of Frederick the Great
Cultural depictions of Joseph II, Holy Roman Emperor
Austria–Prussia relations